Kiwai may refer to:
 Kiwai, Pakistan, a populated place and administrative unit in northern Pakistan
 Kiwai Island, an island in Papua New Guinea
 Kiwai Rural LLG, an administrative unit
 Kiwai language, a language of Papua New Guinea

Language and nationality disambiguation pages